João Canijo (born 1957) is a Portuguese film director. His film Get a Life was screened in the Un Certain Regard section at the 2001 Cannes Film Festival. His 2011 film Blood of My Blood was selected as the Portuguese entry for the Best Foreign Language Oscar at the 85th Academy Awards, but it did not make the final shortlist.

His 2023 film Bad Living won the Silver Bear Jury Prize at the 73rd Berlin International Film Festival

Before his directorial debut, Canijo worked as assistant director for Wim Wenders in The State of Things (1982) and for Werner Schroeter in Der Rosenkönig (1986).

Filmography
 Três Menos Eu (1988)
 Lovely Child/ Filha da Mãe (1989
 Alentejo Sem Lei (1990)
 Black Shoes/ Sapatos Pretos (1998)
 Get a Life/ Ganhar a Vida (2001)
 In the Darkness of the Night/ Noite Escura (2004)
 Misbegotten/ Mal Nascida (2008)
 Lusitanian Illusion (2010)
 Blood of My Blood/Sangue do Meu Sangue (2011)
 É o Amor (Obrigação)
 Bad Living (2023)
 Living Bad (2023)

See also
Jorge Ferreira Chaves

References

External links
 

1957 births
Living people
Portuguese film directors
People from Porto
Portuguese people of Spanish descent
Portuguese people of Brazilian descent
People from Lisbon
University of Porto alumni